Blio is a free-to-download e-reader software platform created by Ray Kurzweil that was unveiled at the Consumer Electronics Show in Las Vegas in early January 2010.  The Blio e-reader preserves typography and supports color illustrations, features that make it effective for certain categories of books not well supported by E Ink, such as cookbooks and children's books. Blio also comes with text-to-speech integration, with support for both a computerized voice and synchronization with professionally recorded audiobooks.

Blio iPhone app supports Rapid Serial Visual Presentation (RSVP) mode. This allows the reader to process up to 1000 words per minute by presenting each word individually. The reader controls the rate of presentation with a screen thumb dial.

In its online bookstore, Blio offers thousands of full color books from hundreds of publishers, with reviews and ratings from Goodreads. Library borrowers can download ebooks and audiobooks borrowed from public libraries via the Blio app.

See also
 3M Cloud Drive
 Adobe Digital Editions
 Aldiko
Amazon Kindle applications
Barnes & Noble Nook e-Reader applications for third party devices
 Calibre
Google eBooks
iTunes
 Kobo eReader

References

External links
 
 Article on Blio creation
 Baker & Taylor

Computer-related introductions in 2010
Electronic paper technology
Ebooks